Chita may refer to:

People
 Alin Chița (born 1978), Romanian footballer
 Oussama Chita (born 1996), Algerian footballer
 Chita Rivera (born 1933), American actress and singer
 Chita Foras (1900–1986), Italian-Argentine actress

Places

Japan
Chita, Aichi
Chita District, Aichi
Chita Peninsula, a peninsula on central Honshu, Japan

Russia
Chita, Zabaykalsky Krai, a city in Zabaykalsky Krai, Russia
Chita Oblast, a former federal subject of Russia
Chita railway station
Chita Republic (1905–1906), a worker's republic 
Chita, another name for the river Chitinka
Chita, Republic of Tatarstan

Other countries
Chita, Boyacá, Colombia
Chita, Texas, United States

Other uses
Chita (film), a Bengali action film
Chita (tug), a Spanish salvage tug, formerly HMS Seahorse
FC Chita, a Russian football club
Cheeta, or chita, a chimpanzee character

See also

Cheetah (disambiguation)
Chica (disambiguation)
Chika (disambiguation)
Chitas, a Hebrew acronym for Chumash, Tehillim, and Tanya
Chitinsky (disambiguation)